Azygophleps is a genus of moths belonging to the family Cossidae.

Description
Azygophleps are a genus of medium-sized moths, with long forewings, light-colored hindwings, and a spotted pattern. While similar to other Cossidae genera such as Sansara, Strigocossus, and Aethalopteryx, Azygophleps can be distinguished from these genera through the females' toothed antennae, long forewings that are rounded at the apex, unique genitalia in both sexes, including the absence of arms on the gnathos of the male of the species. Females, additionally, have a star-like symbol on their genitalia.

Distribution
The 28 species of Azygophleps primarily reside throughout Africa, although a few species have been found in Asia and in the Arabian peninsula.

Species
Azygophleps aburae (Plötz, 1880)
Azygophleps afghanistanensis (Daniel, 1964)
Azygophleps albofasciata (Moore, 1879)
Azygophleps albovittata Bethune-Baker, 1908
Azygophleps asylas (Cramer, 1779)
Azygophleps atrifasciata Hampson, 1910
Azygophleps boisduvalii (Herrich-Schäffer, 1854)
Azygophleps confucianus Yakovlev, 2006
Azygophleps cooksoni Pinhey, 1968
Azygophleps equatorialis Yakovlev, 2011
Azygophleps ganzelkozikmundi Yakovlev, 2009
Azygophleps godswindow Yakovlev & Saldaitis, 2011
Azygophleps inclusa (Walker, 1856)
Azygophleps kovtunovitchi Yakovlev, 2011
Azygophleps larseni Yakovlev & Saldaitis, 2011
Azygophleps legraini Yakovlev & Saldaitis, 2011
Azygophleps leopardina Distant, 1902
Azygophleps liliyae Yakovlev, 2011
Azygophleps liturata (Aurivillius, 1879)
Azygophleps melanophele Hampson, 1910
Azygophleps nubilosa Hampson, 1910
Azygophleps otello Yakovlev, 2011
Azygophleps pallens (Herrich-Schäffer, [1854])
Azygophleps pusilla (Walker, 1856)
Azygophleps regia (Staudinger, 1891)
Azygophleps scalaris (Fabricius, 1775)
Azygophleps sheikh Yakovlev & Saldaitis, 2011
Azygophleps simplex Aurivillius, 1905
Azygophleps sponda (Wallengren, 1875)

References
Cossidae of the Socotra Archipelago (Yemen)

 
Zeuzerinae